Vladimir Petrovich Lukin, sometimes (rarely and erroneously) Lokin, (born 13 July 1937, in Omsk) is a Russian politician who served as Human Rights Commissioner of Russia from February 2004 to March 2014. He was the President of the Russian Paralympic Committee from 1997 to 2021. He was the Russian Ambassador to the United States from 1992 to 1994.

Political activity 
In 1990s, Lukin was one of the founders of the liberal-democratic Yabloko Party (the letter L in "Yabloko" came from his name). He previously served as the deputy chairman of the Russian Duma, chair of the Duma's Foreign Affairs Committee and as Ombudsman.  He is a director on the board of the Nuclear Threat Initiative (NTI), and is also a former Ambassador to the United States. He is considered a long-time specialist in U.S.-Soviet/Russian strategic arms control issues and is a member of Russia's Council on Foreign and Defense Policy, an independent association of national security experts.

On 18 February 2009, at President Medvedev's recommendation, the Russian Duma voted him another five-year term as human rights commissioner. This term expired in March 2014, and Lukin was replaced by Ella Pamfilova.

Awards 
In 2014, Lukin was awarded the Paralympic Order.

References

External links 

 Vladimir Lukin, Deputy Chairman of the Yabloko Association

1937 births
Living people
Politicians from Omsk
Ombudsmen in Russia
Ambassador Extraordinary and Plenipotentiary (Russian Federation)
Ambassadors of Russia to the United States
Yabloko politicians
Recipients of the Order "For Merit to the Fatherland", 3rd class
Communist Party of the Soviet Union members
Recipients of the Paralympic Order
Recipients of the Order "For Merit to the Fatherland", 4th class
First convocation members of the State Duma (Russian Federation)
Second convocation members of the State Duma (Russian Federation)
Third convocation members of the State Duma (Russian Federation)
Members of the Federation Council of Russia (after 2000)